The 2008 Bulgarian Cup Final was the 68th final of the Bulgarian Cup, and was contested between Cherno More Varna and Litex Lovech on 14 May 2008 at Vasil Levski National Stadium in Sofia. Litex won the final 1–0, through a Stanislav Manolev goal in the 58th minute, claiming their third Bulgarian Cup title.

Route to the Final

Match

Details

See also
2007–08 A Group

References 

Bulgarian Cup finals
2007–08 in Bulgarian football
PFC Litex Lovech matches
PFC Cherno More Varna matches